The Couzinet 30 was a light transport aircraft / mailplane designed and built in France in 1930 at Société des Avions René Couzinet.

Design and development
Following closely the design characteristics of the Couzinet Arc en Ciel and other Couzinet tri-motor transport aircraft, the Couzinet 30 was a low-wing cantilever monoplane with fixed spatted undercarriage, three engines mounted on the fuselage nose and in wing nacelles, as well as the characteristic up-swept fuselage, common to most of Couzinet's designs. Intended primarily as a mailplane the Couzinet 30 could also be fitted with three or four passenger seats in the cabin.

Built of wood, with metal fittings the Couzinet 30 had a fixed tail-wheel undercarriage which could be fitted with spats throughout. Control was by conventional controls with ailerons, elevator and rudder. The birch ply skinned ailerons were in two parts, with one connected to the pilots controls and the other connected by an articulated joint, to prevent jamming in the event of wing flexure.

Power was supplied by three  Salmson 9AD radial engines in the nose of the fuselage and nacelles on each wing.

Despite good performance and flying characteristics the Couzinet 30 was not produced in quantity and the sole prototype became the personal transport of René Couzinet.

Specifications (Couzinet 30)

References

External links

 Airwar - in Russian
 Aviafrance: Couzinet 30 n°1 in French

30
1930s French mailplanes
1930s French civil utility aircraft
Low-wing aircraft
Trimotors
Aircraft first flown in 1930